Armenian Evangelical Emmanuel Church is an Armenian Evangelical Church in Aleppo, Syria. The church was established in 1852. However, the current building of the church was erected in 1923 and presently serves as the seat of the Armenian Evangelical congregation in Syria, which is a member of the Union of the Armenian Evangelical Churches in the Near East.

Emmanuel Church was damaged after being shelled by rebels on 17 January 2016.

Pastors
Adoor Agha Niziblian (1852-1855)
Rev. Nazar Makanian (1855-1865)
Rev. Sarkis Sarkissian (1865-1890)*
Rev. Garabed Markarian (1865-1890)*
Mr. Kevork Kazanjian (1865-1890)*
Mr. Garabed Adanalian (1865-1890)*
Mr. Krikor Tchoukourian (1865-1890)*
Mr. Karekin Kouyoumjian (1865-1890)*
Rev. Manouk Missirian (1891-1903)
Rev. Stepan Tovmassian (1904-1913)
Rev. Hovhaness Eskijian (1913-1916)
Visiting pastors and preachers (1917-1923)
Rev. Garabed Haroutounian (1922-1931)
Rev. Sisag Manoukian (1931-1932)
Rev. Siragan Agbabian (1932-1952)
Rev. Soghomon Nuyujukian (1950-1959)
Rev. Hovhannes Karjian (1960-1979; asst. 1956-1958)
Rev. Soghomon Kilaghbian (1980-1995)
Visiting pastors and preachers (1995-1997)
Rev. Serop Megerditchian (1997-2015)
Mr. Samuel Tashjian (2016–2019)

(*years unknown)

References

External links
 AEEC official site 

Armenian churches in Syria
Emmanuel
Armenian Evangelical churches
Churches completed in 1923
1852 establishments in the Ottoman Empire